The Ministry of Transport, Construction and Regional Development (MDVRR), previously the Ministry of Transport, Posts and Telecommunications of SR (MTPT SR), is a government ministry of Slovakia. Its headquarters are in Bratislava. As of 2020, Andrej Doležal is the Minister. It is also known as the MoT SK.

Agencies
The Aviation and Maritime Investigation Authority (AMIA, Letecký a námorný vyšetrovací útvar), an independent part of the MDVRR, is the accident and incident investigation authority of Slovakia.

References

External links

 Ministry of Transport, Construction, and Regional Development
  Ministry of Transport, Construction, and Regional Development (Alternative)

Slovakia
Government of Slovakia
Transport organisations based in Slovakia